Azriana Manalu is an Acehnese women's rights activist and lawyer, who was Chair of the National Commission on Violence against Women (Komnas Perempuan) in Indonesia.

Early life and education 
Manalu was born in Lhoksukon, North Aceh, on 7 March 1968. She graduated with a degree in Law from Syiah Kuala University, Banda Aceh, in 1993.

Career 
Manalu has worked as a lawyer since she was 27 and works to aid victims of violence against women. In 1995 she joined LBH Iskandar Muda Lhoksumawe as a lawyer. From 2000 she worked for LBH APIK Aceh, later joining their Board of Management. She has worked as commissioner of Komnas Perempuan since 2009 and was elected as Chair in 2015, a role she held until 2019.

References

External links 

 Women's rights in the Indonesian province of Aceh (interview)
 Ucapan Ketua Purnabakti Komnas Perempuan Periode 2014-2019 Azriana Manalu (film)

Acehnese people
Indonesian women's rights activists
Living people
Year of birth missing (living people)
Indonesian women lawyers
Syiah Kuala University alumni